Sir George Gillespie Baker, OBE, PC (25 April 1910–13 June 1984) was President of the Family Division (formerly of the Probate, Divorce and Admiralty Division) of the High Court of Justice from 1971 to 1979 and a Judge in the Division from 1961 to 1979.

He also served as Assistant Adjutant General on the British War Crimes Executive at the Nuremberg Trials from 1945 to 1946.

Biography
George Gillespie Baker was educated at Glasgow Academy; Strathallan School, Perthshire and Brasenose College, Oxford (Hon. Scholarship; Senator Hulme Scholar), where he later became an Honorary Fellow.  He received a Call to the bar by the Middle Temple in 1932 and would in later life become Treasurer of the Inn in 1976. At the beginning of the Second World War Baker joined the army and after a brief spell in the Queen's Own Royal West Kent Regiment he was commissioned in the Cameronians (Scottish Rifles) in 1940.

Baker served as Deputy Assistant Adjutant General at the War Office 1941–1942, Assistant Adjutant General with the Allied Force Headquarters 1942–44, Colonel 'A' 15th Army Group, 1945 and Assistant Adjutant General on the British War Crimes Executive at the Nuremberg Trials in 1945–1946. In 1945 he unsuccessfully contested the Southall (UK Parliament constituency) in the 1945 United Kingdom general election as a Conservative candidate.

After the war Baker resumed his career at the Bar, mostly on the then Oxford Circuit. He was Recorder in turn of Bridgnorth (1946-1951), Smethwick (1951-1952) and Wolverhampton (1952-1961). Appointed a Queen's Counsel in 1952, Deputy Chairman of the Shropshire Quarter Sessions from 1954 until 1971 and Leader of the Oxford Circuit for seven years until his promotion to a High Court Judge in 1961. Baker's deep personal integrity was founded on his staunch Presbyterian faith.

Honours/Awards
 Appointed an Officer of the Most Excellent Order of the British Empire, 1945. 
 Appointed a Knight Bachelor in 1961. 
 Appointed a Privy Counsellor of the Privy Council of the United Kingdom in 1971.
 Honorary Member Canadian Bar Association.
 Freedom of the City of London, 1981.

References

 Obituary, The Times, 14 June 1984.

1910 births
1984 deaths
People educated at the Glasgow Academy
People educated at Strathallan School
Alumni of Brasenose College, Oxford
Cameronians officers
British Army personnel of World War II
British King's Counsel
Family Division judges
Conservative Party (UK) parliamentary candidates
Probate, Divorce and Admiralty Division judges
Members of the Privy Council of the United Kingdom
Officers of the Order of the British Empire
Knights Bachelor
Scottish knights
Scottish Presbyterians
20th-century British lawyers
Presidents of the Family Division
Presidents of the Probate, Divorce and Admiralty Division
Queen's Own Royal West Kent Regiment soldiers
War Office personnel in World War II